Master of Corporate Communication (MCC), or Master of Science in Corporate Communication (MSc.CC), is a post-graduate master's degree designed to prepare communication professionals who in time will function as Corporate Communication Officer (CCO) at a strategic level in the organization. The MCC program structure and admissions are similar to that of the Master of Business Administration and Master of Science in Management degrees. The equivalent of MCC at some universities is Master's in Communication, Master  (of Arts) in Public Relations, Master (of Science) in Communication Management.

Admission 
B-school MCC Admission Committees normally evaluate applicants based on resume, letters of recommendation, work experiences, as well as by a candidate's bachelor's degree GPA and GPA of graduate studies if applicable.

Based on these indicators, the committee decides if the applicant can handle the academic rigor of the program and demonstrate considerable leadership potential. The committee also looks for applicants that can improve diversity in the classroom as well as contribute positively to the student body as a whole.

Programme structure 
The MCC structure varies from program to program, but typically resembles one of the five major types of MBAs (distance-learning, part-time, accelerated, two-year, or executive).

The MCC program for professionals often resembles one of a distance-learning, part-time, accelerated, or two-year MBA program.  Most programs begin with a set of required courses and then offer more specialized courses two thirds of the way through the program.

Courses 
Depending on the each university, the general management courses may include, but are not limited to the following courses: 
 Strategic Marketing
 Reputation Management
 Issues Management
 Corporate Strategy
 Organizational Behavior
 Industrial Organization
 Accounting
 Data Analysis

Some of the more subject-oriented topics (electives) in an MCC program include:
 Corporate Branding
 Integrated Marketing Communication
 Business and Marketing Strategy
 Business, Marketing, Advertising and Media Planning
 Crisis Communication
 Internal Communication and Change Management
 Stakeholder Relations and Communication
 Organizational Identity
 Corporate Social Responsibility / Corporate Shared Value
 Organizational Reputation Management
 Sponsoring and Partnerships
 Commercial Communication Law
 Corporate Communication and Market Research Methods
 KPIs and Performance Analytics
 Public Affairs
 and Issues Management

Graduation requirements

Graduation requirements are different for full-time MCC program from that for executive professionals. Total number of credits required for graduation in regular MCC program may differ from one university to another. However, usually the required number of credits for master program in countries practicing the Bologna system of education is no less than 120 ECTS. The number of credits for executive master programs  is usually not less than 60 ECTS, depending on the university.

Europe 
In 1997 the Corporate Communication Centre, an entity of the Rotterdam School of Management of the Erasmus University Rotterdam started with the Master of Corporate Communication program, developed by prof.dr. Cees van Riel. On a worldwide basis, it was the first program of its kind offered on a university level. Since then at least four other European universities have started offering MCC program. At present MCC is offered also at Aarhus University, IE Business School in Madrid, Spain (who also offers an Executive Masters of Corporate Communication degree), Sorbonne University, Universität Leipzig, Universidad de Navarra, Rome Business School in Rome, Italy and Università della Svizzera Italiana.

In 2008 the Master of Corporate Communication Program at the Rotterdam School of Management was accredited by the NVAO, the Accreditation Organisation of the Netherlands and Flanders, to hold the Master of Science in Corporate Communication (MSc. CC) title.

External links
Master of Corporate Communication, Rotterdam School of Management
RSM on Financial Times Top 10 Masters in Management Rankings 2008
 University of Paris, Communication des entreprises et des institutions
 University of Lugano, MCC
Master in Corporate Communication, IE School of Communication, IE University
Master in Corporate Communication, TRACOR, The Communication Arts Institute
Master's Program in Corporate Communication, Aalto University School of Business

References

Business schools in the Netherlands
Erasmus University Rotterdam
Master's degrees